Ashab al-Kahf is an Iraqi Shia militant group that has been described as a proxy formation of Iran. The group first emerged in August 2019, but increased in activity following the assassination of Qasem Soleimani. It has attacked targets associated with the United States using rockets and improvised explosive devices. The group denies maintaining relationships with other Iranian-backed Shia paramilitary groups, such as Kata'ib Hezbollah and Asa'ib Ahl al-Haq.

History 
The group announced its existence on Twitter in August 2019 following several suspected Israeli airstrikes on Shia militant groups in Iraq. It threatened retaliation against future attacks, stating "Americans and the Israelis should know that bombings will be met with bombings, assassinations for assassinations, and kidnappings for kidnappings".

In May 2020, the group criticized the leaders of other Iranian-backed Shia paramilitary groups through their Telegram channel, claiming some were "traitors" secretly advancing the interests of the United States and Israel, while others were morally corrupt. The group stated Soleimani and Abu Mahdi al-Muhandis were "backstabbed" by such groups. It added cooperation with the administration of Iraqi prime minister Mustafa Al-Kadhimi was impossible because he is a "CIA agent".

On 11 August 2020, Ashab al-Kahf claimed it had bombed a US logistics convoy near the Iraqi border with Kuwait. The group stated that it had destroyed "equipment and vehicles belonging to the American enemy" and released an 11-second video showing an explosion. Iraq and Kuwait stated no such attack took place.

On 27 October 2020, Ashab al-Kahf offered a reward between $20,000 and US$50,000 to Iraqis who could supply information concerning the activities of investors and economists from the United States, Saudi Arabia, the United Arab Emirates and the United Kingdom.

On 17 November 2020, three rockets targeted the Embassy of the United States in Baghdad's Green Zone. The Iraqi Army stated one rocket landed in a civilian area, killing a young child and injuring five civilians. Ashab al-Kahf claimed responsibility for the attack through Telegram. American officials stated that American facilities and personnel were unharmed.

The group condemned the reopening of the Arar border crossing between Iraq and Saudi Arabia, stating it was committed to the "rejection of the Saudi project in Iraq".

On 10 December 2020, Ashab al-Kahf threatened to attack US bases throughout the Middle East, including Al Udeid Air Base in Qatar.

On 15 February 2021, the group attacked a Turkish military base in Mosul.

References 

Arab militant groups
Jihadist groups in Iraq
Islamism in Iraq
Anti-Americanism
Axis of Resistance
Shia Islamist groups
Islamist groups
Paramilitary organizations based in Iraq